The Keisley Limestone is a geologic formation in England. It preserves fossils dating back to the Late Ordovician period.

See also

 List of fossiliferous stratigraphic units in England

References
 

Geologic formations of England
Ordovician System of Europe
Ordovician England
Limestone formations